The National Development University "Veteran" of East Java is a public university located in Surabaya, East Java, Indonesia which was established on July 5, 1959. UPN "Veteran" in East Java is a very large institution with 20,000 students from various provinces in Indonesia as well as foreign students. UPN “Veteran” in East Java was founded by veterans of freedom fighters as a living monument to the development of education in Indonesia. In its development, UPN "Veteran" in East Java has undergone several name and status changes. This 63-year-old Indonesian university has a selective admission policy based on entrance exams. An acceptance rate range of 0-10% makes this Indonesian higher education organization a highly selective institution. International applicants are eligible to apply. UPN also provides several academic and non-academic facilities and services to students, including libraries, dormitories, sports facilities, financial assistance and/or scholarships, study abroad and exchange programs, as well as administrative services.

History 
 From 1959 to 1965 it was named the Academy of Corporate Administration Veteran Surabaya Branch.
 In 1968 it changed its name to the National Higher Education Development "Veteran" East Java Branch.
 From 1976 to 1994 it was in transition as Veteran East Java Branch as a university under the guidance of the Department of Defense and Security Affairs.
 In 1977 the name was changed to the National Development University Veteran East Java Branch.
 In 1995 it became a private university with the name of University of Pembangunan Nasional Veteran at East Java. It is operationally under the guidance of the Foundation of Kejuangan Panglima Sudirman and functionally under the guidance of the Department of Defense and Security Affairs.
 In 2007 University of Pembangunan National Veteran came under the guidance of the Foundation of Education and Welfare, which is functionally under the guidance of the Ministry of Defense.
 In 2014 UPN Veteran at East Java became a public university.

Faculty 
UPN Veteran has seven faculties (colleges) with 19 study and postgraduate programs.
 Faculty of Economics and Business
 Economic Development Department
 Management Department
 Accounting Department
 Faculty of Social and Political Sciences
 Public Administration Department 
 Business Administration Department 
 Communication Science Department 
 International Relations Department 
 Tourism Department
 Faculty of Law
 Law Science Department
 Faculty of Agriculture
 Agrotechnology Department
 Master of Agrotechnology Department
 Agribusiness Department
 Faculty of Engineering
 Chemical Engineering Department
 Industrial Engineering Department
 Civil Engineering Department
 Environmental Engineering Department
 Food Technology Department
 Machine Engineering Department
 Faculty of Computer Sciences
 Informatics Engineering Department
 Information System Department
 Data Science Department
 Faculty of Architecture and Design
 Architecture Department
 Visual Communication Design Department
 Graduate program
 Master of Agribusiness Department
 Master of Management Department
 Master of Accounting Department
 Master of Environment Department
 Master of Agrotechnology Department
 Doctor of Philosophy
 Doctor of Agribusiness Department

Facilities 

 Library (text books, reference books, research journals, magazines, scripts, theses) 
 Information Communication and Computer Center and hotspots (WiFi area) 
 Language Center (English, French, Mandarin and German)
 Polyclinic (health care)
 Sports Center (Olympic standard swimming pool, tennis courts, soccer field, basketball court) 
 Multipurpose building for sports, graduation, arts and exhibitions
 Greenhouse and field laboratory for agriculture research 
 Guest house capacity (10 rooms) 
 Students' dormitory for 400 students (with a meeting hall and parking area)

External links 
 Institution of Research and Public Services
 Digital Repository

Universities in Indonesia
Educational institutions established in 1959
Educational institutions in Surabaya
Universities in East Java
1959 establishments in Indonesia